Kim Yeo-yeong (born 26 June 1979) is a South Korean diver. She competed in the women's 10 metre platform event at the 1996 Summer Olympics.

References

1979 births
Living people
South Korean female divers
Olympic divers of South Korea
Divers at the 1996 Summer Olympics
Place of birth missing (living people)
20th-century South Korean women